Novo Nevesinje is a settlement in the region of Baranja, Croatia. Administratively, it is located in the Petlovac municipality within the Osijek-Baranja County. Population is 63 people.

History

Novo Nevesinje has existed as part of the settlement from 1880. Its name was Piskora from 1880–1931. It was formally established as an independent settlement in 1991, when it was separated from the territory of Baranjsko Petrovo Selo.

Population

Ethnic composition, 1991. census

References

Literature

 Book: "Narodnosni i vjerski sastav stanovništva Hrvatske, 1880–1991: po naseljima, author: Jakov Gelo, izdavač: Državni zavod za statistiku Republike Hrvatske, 1998., ;

See also
Osijek-Baranja county
Baranja

Populated places in Osijek-Baranja County
Baranya (region)
1991 establishments in Croatia
Serb communities in Croatia